St. Mark's Episcopal Church is a historic church in Cheyenne, Wyoming.

It was designed by architect Henry M. Congdon in an Old English style and was built during 1886–1888. It was added to the National Register of Historic Places in 1970.

The church was supposedly designed in the style of the 1080-built Stoke Poges Church near London, in England.

References

External links
 
 St. Mark's Episcopal Church, 1908 Central Avenue, Cheyenne, Laramie, WY ar  the Historic American Buildings Survey (HABS)

Episcopal churches in Wyoming
Churches on the National Register of Historic Places in Wyoming
Churches completed in 1886
Churches in Cheyenne, Wyoming
Historic American Buildings Survey in Wyoming
19th-century Episcopal church buildings
National Register of Historic Places in Cheyenne, Wyoming